Ogonowice  is a village in the administrative district of Gmina Opoczno, within Opoczno County, Łódź Voivodeship, in central Poland. It has a Polish name of województwo łódzkie [vɔjɛˈvut͡stfɔ ˈwut͡skʲɛ] or simply Łódzkie.

References

Villages in Opoczno County